Pavlin Demski or Paulin Demski was a seventeenth-century Catholic missionary whose activities were aimed to convert Orthodox Serbs to Catholicism. In the middle of the seventeenth century he was the main Catholic missionary in Montenegro. Demski was suitable person for propagation of the Eastern Catholicism also because he was from the territory whose people were already converted, so this conversion could be used as an example.

Missionary activities 
Together with some other missionaries, Demski was sent by the Sacred Congregation for the Propagation of the Faith to convert Orthodox Serbs to Catholicism. Roman Curia appointed Demski as a teacher in schools which were planned to be opened on the territories populated by the Serbs. The Roman Curia carefully planned this mission and establishment of the Latin language schools planned to educate children of the pre-Ottoman Serb noble families as young Catholic priests. The first of such schools was planned to be opened in Peć, where Demski first headed to. Since Demski was afraid to travel to Peć while Serbian Patriarch was in Istanbul, in December 1649 he stopped his journey in Kotor where he opened the first such school. Based on the proposal of Frano Bolica and contrary to the objections of the local clergy, Roman Curia allowed Demski to hold services in the Church of Saint Luka in Kotor. In the autumn of 1654 Demski and his companions were attacked by the Ottomans while they were travelling from Kotor to Montenegrin hinterland.

Demski died at the beginning of 1656.

Legacy 

Many of Demski's reports were proven false. In his letters Demski was boasting that he managed to convert Serbian Patriarch, which is proven false because Serbian Patriarch was in Russia at the time in question. Jovan Radonić proved that Morača sabor of 1654 was invented by Demski. His reports were not objective and should be always compared with other sources because of his continuous efforts to discredit Orthodox clergy. Still, Demski was sometimes successful in his mission. His greatest success was conversion of the Montenegrin metropolitan of Cetinje Mardarije Kornečanin.

References

Sources 

 
 
 
 
 
 
 
 
 
 
 
 
 

1656 deaths
Members of the Congregation for the Evangelization of Peoples
Roman Catholic missionaries in Montenegro
Deaths in Montenegro
Serbian Eastern Catholics